is a Japanese band that combines rock music with wagakki (traditional Japanese musical instruments) and shigin (Japanese poems reciting art). Their early songs were adapted from Vocaloid recordings but they have since written their own original music. Their music videos for the songs  and  have attracted millions of views on YouTube. They have played live in Asia, Europe, and the United States.

History

2012–2013: Conception and early work 
Shigin singer Yuko Suzuhana (who had been elected Miss Nico Nama ニコ生 in 2011), shakuhachi player Daisuke Kaminaga, and koto player Kiyoshi Ibukuro formed the band Hanafugetsu in February 2012. Suzuhana also played piano at this time. Suzuhana then conceived a band that fused the traditional and modern sides of Japanese culture, leading to the formation of Wagakki Band.

In August 2012 the members of Hanafugetsu met guitarist Machiya, who was a notable session musician with a reputation for fast playing. Around this time, Suzuhana also met drummer Wasabi at an event by Nico Nico Douga. Wasabi, Kaminaga, and Ibukuro had all previously worked with wadaiko player Kurona, who was invited to join the new ensemble. The band's first work, still under the name Hanafugetsu, was an adaptation of the Vocaloid song "Tsuki Kage Mai Ka" (月・影・舞・華) with Kanade on shamisen and Shirakami Mashiro on bass. A video of the recording was released in October 2012 and went viral, remaining in the top 3 of the "Played It" category since then.

Bassist Asa, a popular Vocaloid producer and creator of the hit song "Yoshiwara Lament", then joined the band. During a gig in a Shibuya bar, the band was approached by shamisen player Ninagawa Beni, who became the final addition to the band. The formation of the new band was officially announced in March 2013. They initially operated under the name Suzuhana Yuko with Wagakki Band, but by early 2014 the name was shortened to simply Wagakki Band.

2013–2014: Early mainstream success 
A video for the first song recorded by all eight current members of Wagakki Band, "Six Trillion Years and Overnight Story" (六兆年と一夜物語), was released in April 2013. In August of that year they played their first live concert at Nico Nico Music Master 2. The music video for "Tengaku" (天樂) was released in October 2013; this video marked the first time guitarist Machiya revealed his face. They then performed at the 10th Tokyo International Music Market (TIMM) for three nights in October. At THE VOC@LOID M@STER 27, a Vocaloid convention in November 2013, the band released Joshou (序章), a mini album featuring Vocaloid covers. 

Wagakki Band held their first new year's concert, Wagakki Band Daishinnenkai 2014~Wagakki X Band Gassen~ (和楽器バンド大新年会~和楽器Xバンド合戦~), on 31 January 2014 at Shibuya's Club Asia. On the same day, they released the music video for "Senbonzakura" (千本桜), which instantly became a hit on both Nico Nico Douga and YouTube, expanding their international exposure. Wagakki Band covered Vocaloid songs for their first full-length album Vocalo Zanmai (ボカロ三昧), released in April 2014. The album reached no. 5 in the weekly Oricon rankings and stayed in the top 100 for 22 consecutive weeks. After their early Vocaloid works, Wagakki Band has composed original music for their subsequent albums.`

The band held their first overseas performance at Japan Expo 2014 in Paris, France in July, in front of 4,000 attendees. Their first independent concert, Vocalo Zanmai Dai Ensoukai (ボカロ三昧大演奏会), was held later in July at Shibuya's Music Exchange. The music video for Wagakki Band's first original song, "Hanabi" (華火), was released on Nico Nico Douga in July 2014, followed by a retail release. In August they appeared at Japan's a-Nation Festival, followed by an appearance at a-Nation Singapore Premium Showcase Festival in October. The band wrapped up 2014 with the DVD and Blu-ray release of the Vocalo Zanmai Dai Ensoukai concert.

2015–2020: International recognition 
The band's first hall concert, Wagakki Band Daishinnenkai 2015 (和楽器バンド大新年会2015), was held at Shibuya Public Hall in January 2015. Their first independent overseas concert, Taipei Dayanchanghui (台北大演唱会), was held in Taiwan in May of that year.  Also in 2015, Wagakki Band headlined a sold-out concert at Club Nokia in Los Angeles in conjunction with Anime Expo. The Vocaloid IA software persona was the opening act, also in her first North American live show. They appeared in their first television commercial that year, for Kirin Mets. The album Yasou Emaki (八奏絵卷) was released in September 2015 and reached number one on the weekly Oricon chart.

On 6 January 2016, the band held its annual New Year's concert, Wagakki Band Daishinnenkai 2016 Nippon Budokan: Akatsuki no Utage (和楽器バンド大新年会2016日本武道館 -暁ノ宴) at the Nippon Budokan. The concert was attended by approximately 10,000 people. The album  was released in 2017, followed by Otonoe (オトノエ) in 2018.

In May 2019, Wagakki Band performed as part of Japan Night 2019 in New York with Hyde, Misia, and Puffy AmiYumi. A month later, the band signed a global contract with Universal Music Japan sublabel Universal Sigma after five years with Avex Group. As part of the deal, the band's management was transferred to the newly-formed . In a press statement published by Suzuhana, the band wanted to challenge themselves in a new musical environment. The EP React, featuring four new songs, was released in December 2019.

On 16 February 2020, the band performed their "Premium Symphonic Night Vol.2" concert at Osaka-jō Hall, featuring a full orchestra and a special guest appearance by Evanescence lead vocalist Amy Lee. Lee also collaborated with the band in recording the single "Sakura Rising". The band's fifth studio album Tokyo Singing, which includes the collaboration with Amy Lee, was released in October 2020.

On 17 August 2022, the band released their sixth studio album Vocalo Zanmai 2 to commemorate their eighth anniversary. Four days later, Suzuhana announced that she and Ibukuro married on 4 March 2020, and she was pregnant with their first child. On 22 September, the band announced they would host their Vocalo Zanmai 2 tour without Suzuhana due to her pregnancy and health issues. Suzuhana gave birth to a baby girl on 25 November.

Members
  – vocals
  – guitar, vocals
  – tsugaru shamisen
  – koto
  – bass
  – shakuhachi
  – drums
  – wadaiko

Discography

 Vocalo Zanmai (2014)
 Yasou Emaki (2015)
 Shikisai (2017)
 Otonoe (2018)
 Tokyo Singing (2020)
 Vocalo Zanmai 2 (2022)

Awards

See also
 Vocaloid
Hanafugetsu

References

External links
 
  (Universal Music Japan)
  (Avex Group)
 
 
 Wagakki Band at Oricon

 
Japanese folk musicians
Japanese heavy metal musical groups
Musical groups from Tokyo
2013 establishments in Japan
Musical groups established in 2013
Avex Trax artists
Universal Music Japan artists
Female-fronted musical groups